Melissa DiMarco is a Canadian actress, producer, and television personality. She has made acting appearances in feature films and television. She is best known for her role as Daphne Hatzilakos in the teen drama series Degrassi: The Next Generation (2002-2010) and as the host and showrunner of her own syndicated television program Out There with Melissa DiMarco.

Career

On television, one of DiMarco's best-known acting parts was in the teen drama series Degrassi: The Next Generation as Daphne Hatzilakos, teacher and later Principal of Degrassi Community School. She played Hatzilakos for eight seasons (2002 - 2010). DiMarco's TV credits include the CBC soap opera Riverdale and guest-starring spots on series such as Due South, Blue Murder, The Hardy Boys, Psi Factor, Kung Fu: The Legend Continues, Relic Hunter, and Kojak.

Her film credits include roles in Peter Bogdanovich's Hustle: The Pete Rose Story, Duct Tape Forever (the film adaptation of The Red Green Show), The Rest of My Life: Degrassi Takes Manhattan, and Degrassi Spring Break Movie. She also appeared in Danny DeVito's dark comedy, Death to Smoochy.

She also directed, produced, and wrote Dreamseeker: Nia Vardalos, an award-winning documentary on the rise of Nia Vardalos of My Big Fat Greek Wedding fame and was the host and producer of Nite Life, an entertainment show that focused on celebrity interviews and the nightclub, bar, and concert scene, which aired on OMNI.

Since 2004, DiMarco has hosted the Out There with Melissa DiMarco television comedy which airs on Citytv's national network and The Biography Channel. Excerpts from DiMarco's celebrity interviews also air on OUTtv. The show mixes celebrity interviews with scripted comedy that takes a behind-the-scenes look at the life of an entertainment journalist (played by DiMarco). Among the celebrities she has interviewed on the show are Pierce Brosnan, George Clooney, Cameron Diaz, Colin Farrell, Salma Hayek, Queen Latifah, Ludacris, Matthew McConaughey, Brad Pitt, and Gene Simmons. Updates and excerpts from these interviews are syndicated internationally. Out There has been recognized for Outstanding Achievement in Creative Excellence at the 39th U.S. International Film and Video Festival.

DiMarco is a Dean's Honour Roll graduate of the Fine Arts Program at York University and is a member of the Canadian Association of Journalists, the Academy of Canadian Cinema, and WIFT-T (Women in Film & Television Toronto).

Filmography

Television Producer
2004: Dreamseeker: Nia Vardalos (documentary)

Further reading

 , regarding her movie appearance in Duct Tape Forever

References

External links
Official Website of her show Out There with Melissa DiMarco
Official Facebook Fan Page of Out There with Melissa DiMarco
Melissa DiMarco's Personal Twitter Feed''

TV.com: Degrassi: The Next Generation
"Out There, Right Here with Melissa DiMarco", Beaches | Life (December 2012 – January 2013)
"Melissa DiMarco: In entertainment, nothing is off limits" by Diana Di Mauro, Panoram Italia (August 3, 2012)
"A-list celebrities help comedian spoof herself" by Justin Skinner, InsideToronto.com (March 27, 2011)
"Melissa DiMarco" by Ellen Douglas, Toronto Waterfront Magazine (November - December 2004)
"Getting Out There With Melissa Dimarco!", Living the Canadian Dream Podcast With Bradley Thompson

Actresses from Toronto
Canadian film actresses
Canadian people of Italian descent
Canadian soap opera actresses
Canadian television actresses
Canadian television hosts
Members of the Canadian Association of Journalists
Living people
York University alumni
Canadian infotainers
1969 births
Canadian women television hosts